Conservatives and Reformists may refer to:

 European Conservatives and Reformists, a group in the European Parliament
 Alliance of European Conservatives and Reformists, a European-wide political party based around the European Conservatives and Reformists
 Conservatives and Reformists (Italy), a political party in Italy named after the European Conservatives and Reformists